Olga Cebotari (born 4 January 1992) is a Moldovan politician and diplomat. She served as Deputy Prime Minister for Reintegration of the Republic of Moldova in the Chicu Cabinet.

Career
Olga Cebotari was born in 1992 in Chișinău. She studied International Relations at the Russian University of Friendship of Peoples, Faculty of "Human and Social Sciences", Moscow, Russian Federation (from 2010 to 2014). In 2016 Cebotari graduated her master's degree in world politics at the diplomatic Academy of the Ministry of Foreign Affairs of the Russian Federation, Moscow, Faculty of ‘International relations and International Law’. In 2020 she completed her doctoral studies at the diplomatic Academy of the Ministry of Foreign Affairs of the Russian Federation, the specialty “political issues in International relations, Global and Regional Development”.

From 2017 to 2019 Olga Cebotari was director of the “Center for support of Moldavian Youth” in Moscow, the Russian Federation. Since 1 February 2020 she has been appointed deputy director of the Economic Department, Executive Committee in the Commonwealth of Independent States. On 9 November 2020 she became Deputy Prime Minister for Reintegration of Moldova and served his position until 5 August 2021. On December 31, when Prime-minister Ion Chicu resigned, he recommended Cebotari to be the acting Prime-minister. However, the president Maia Sandu chose Aureliu Ciocoi to become the acting Prime-minister.

On 31 January 2022, Cebotari was elected by the Republican Council of the Party of Socialists of the Republic of Moldova (PSRM) as a member of the new governing body of the party.

Personal life
Olga Cebotari is married to Romanian businessman Octavian Popa. She speaks Romanian, Russian, Spanish and English. She also holds Russian citizenship.

References

Moldovan women diplomats
Diplomats from Chișinău
Party of Socialists of the Republic of Moldova politicians
Moldovan expatriates in Russia
Naturalised citizens of Russia
1992 births
Living people